Mauno Lindroos (born 10 March 1941) is a Finnish weightlifter. He competed in the men's heavyweight event at the 1968 Summer Olympics.

References

External links
 

1941 births
Living people
Finnish male weightlifters
Olympic weightlifters of Finland
Weightlifters at the 1968 Summer Olympics
People from Ulvila
Sportspeople from Satakunta
20th-century Finnish people